The Oddventures of Mr. Cool is the seventh studio album of Filipino rap artist Francis Magalona, released in 1998. The album contains more of a mellow, urban-style kind of music which is reminiscent of his debut album Yo!. Several songs on The Oddventures of Mr. Cool are sampled from foreign artists, including Whodini's "Friends", as heard on "Friends".

Track listing

Trivia
The track "Whole Lotta Lovin'" has a music video. Much of its music samples the intro of "Alapaap", a song performed by the Eraserheads, & its bridge part samples Madonna's 'Everybody' lines '(Dance & sing yeah, up and do the thing)'.

Credits
Executive Producer: Rudy Y. Tee
A & R Executive: Vic Valenciano & Romel Sanchez
A & R Coordinator: Diego Castillo
Design Lay Out: Mark Aquino & John Joel Lopez

References

1998 albums
Francis Magalona albums